Celenza Valfortore is a town and comune in the province of Foggia in the Apulia region of southeast Italy.

Main sights 
Church of Santa Croce
Porta Nova
 Gambacorta Castle (15th and 16th centuries)

Demographics 

The population has been constantly shrinking in recent years. A massive emigration occurred during and after the Second World War. Numerous inhabitants moved to countries such as Argentina, the United States, and Australia.

Economy 

Agriculture used to employ the major part of the labour force. Cattle and farming were the main activities, although in the last years this has been changing, with the tertiary sector employing 41 percent of the working force.

Climate 

Winters are cold, influenced by the Apennines, with occasional snowfalls taking place between the months of November and March.

Summers are extremely dry and hot. Almost no rainfall occurs between June and August.

References

External links 
 Our Celenza Heritage A site dedicated to the descendants of Celenza Valfortore and their immigrant ancestors
 Celenza Valfortore and San Marco la Catola Online  An Italian language site dedicated to these two neighboring villages, includes pictures, traditions, news, and links

Cities and towns in Apulia